Urbanus is a genus of skipper butterflies erected by Jacob Hübner in 1807, placed to subtribe Eudamina. Species of the genus are found from the southern United States to South America.

Taxonomy
The genus has been subject to several revisions, one of which led to the type genus of subfamily Eudaminae, genus Eudamus, becoming a junior synonym of Urbanus. As a result of genome analysis of the Eudaminae, several species formerly considered part of Urbanus have been transferred to other genera, including to Cecropterus and Spicauda.

Species

Except where separately referenced, this species list follows the classification of Li et al. 2019, with distribution data sourced from Markku Savela's Lepidoptera and Some Other Life Forms.

Subgenus Urbanoides
Urbanus esmeraldus (A. Butler, 1877) – Mexico, Costa Rica, Guatemala, Panama, Honduras to Brazil, Colombia
Urbanus esma Evans, 1952 – Brazil
Urbanus prodicus E. Bell, 1956 – Mexico
Urbanus elmina Evans, 1952 – Ecuador
Urbanus evona Evans, 1952 – Mexico, Guatemala
Urbanus esta Evans, 1952 – Mexican coasts to Ecuador and Brazil
Urbanus viridis H. Freeman, 1970 – Mexico

Subgenus Urbanus
Urbanus velinus (Plötz, 1881) – Brazil, Guyana
Urbanus proteus (Linnaeus, 1758) – southern US, Mexico, Central & South America
Urbanus proteus proteus (Linnaeus, 1758) – Mexico
Urbanus proteus domingo (Scudder, 1872) – Saba to Grenada, Haiti
Urbanus magnus Steinhauser, 1981 – Ecuador
Urbanus pronus Evans, 1952 – Central America, Ecuador, Bolivia, Brazil, Paraguay; Mexico
Urbanus pronta Evans, 1952 – Mexico, Honduras
Urbanus parvus Austin, 1998 – Brazil
Urbanus longicaudus Austin, 1998 – Brazil
Urbanus villus Austin, 1998 – Brazil
Urbanus huancavillcas (R. Williams, 1926) – Ecuador
Urbanus belli (Hayward, 1935) – Mexico to Bolivia to Argentina
Urbanus bernikerni Burns, 2014 
Urbanus ehakernae Burns, 2014
Urbanus segnestami Burns, 2014
Urbanus viterboana (Ehrmann, 1907) – Mexico to Colombia, Ecuador
Urbanus dubius Steinhauser, 1981 – Colombia
Urbanus megalurus (Mabille, 1877)
Urbanus tucuti (R. Williams, 1927)

Former species
Transferred to Cecropterus:
Urbanus dorantes (Stoll, 1790)
Urbanus obscurus (Hewitson, 1867)
Urbanus evenus (Ménétriés, 1855)
Urbanus virescens (Mabille, 1877)
Urbanus trebia (Möschler, 1879)
Urbanus carmelita (Herrich-Schäffer, 1869)
Urbanus reductus (N. Riley, 1919)
Urbanus doryssus (Swainson, 1831)
Urbanus albimargo (Mabille, 1875)

Transferred to Spicauda:
Urbanus teleus (Hübner, 1821)
Urbanus tanna Evans, 1952
Urbanus ambiguus de Jong, 1983
Urbanus cindra Evans, 1952
Urbanus zagorus (Plötz, 1881)
Urbanus simplicius (Stoll, 1790)
Urbanus procne (Plötz, 1881)

Transferred to Telegonus
Urbanus chalco (Hübner, 1823)

References

External links

Eudaminae
Butterflies of North America
Butterflies of Central America
Hesperiidae of South America
Lepidoptera of the Caribbean
Hesperiidae genera
Taxa named by Jacob Hübner